Lee Hawkins, Jr. is an American journalist and musician.

Early  life
Hawkins grew up in Maplewood, Minnesota. His father, Lee Hawkins, Sr., is an Alabama native. Hawkins attended the University of Wisconsin–Madison, graduating with a degree in political science.

Journalism career
Hawkins began his career as a business reporter for the Milwaukee Journal Sentinel and the Wisconsin State Journal.

Hawkins is a reporter and news editor for The Wall Street Journal. Since 2011 he has also done on-camera interviews for the WSJ website and their sister site WSJ Live. He has interviewed celebrities from the business, sports and entertainment worlds, in many cases for a series of segments titled The Business of Celebrity w/ Lee Hawkins.

He is also a regular guest on Fox Business Network.

Hawkins' friend coined the term "NEWBOs", or "New Black Overclass", to describe a younger generation of wealthy and business-savvy African-American celebrities, but it was Hawkins who ran with the idea. In 2009 he presented the CNBC special NEWBOs: The Rise of the New Black Overclass, which profiled LeBron James, Kirk Franklin and Terrell Owens, among others.

Hawkins is a member of the National Association of Black Journalists.

Musical career
Hawkins won the John Lennon Songwriting Contest in the R&B category in 2011 for his song "I Love You Woman". In 2012 he released the album Midnight Conversations, which included the song.

Hawkins had an on-camera interview with children's music group The Wiggles in 2013 in which he ended up singing with the group. They invited him to sing onstage with them several days later. He then appeared on their 2014 DVD Wiggle House, and was a guest singer (on "This Little Piggy Went to Market") on their 2014 album Apples and Bananas.

In 2015 Hawkins released the Christmas album Songs About the Birth of Jesus, in which he sings with his father.

References

External links
 Lee Hawkins Twitter feed

People from Maplewood, Minnesota
African-American journalists
21st-century African-American male singers
The Wall Street Journal people
 University of Wisconsin–Madison College of Letters and Science alumni